The following is a list of all team-to-team transactions that have occurred in the National Hockey League (NHL) during the 1939–40 NHL season. It lists which team each player has been traded to and for which player(s) or other consideration(s), if applicable.

Transactions 

Notes
 Transaction completed on May 21, 1940.

References

Transactions
National Hockey League transactions